Sagittaria engelmanniana (Engelmann's arrowhead or acid-water arrowhead) is an aquatic plant species native to eastern North America. It has been reported from every state bordering on the Gulf of Mexico or on the Atlantic Ocean from Mississippi to Massachusetts, plus Vermont and Ontario.

Sagittaria engelmanniana occurs in wetlands, predominantly those with acidic water such as Sphagnum bogs. It is a perennial herb up to 70 cm tall. Leaves are sagittate (arrow-shaped) with 3 very narrow lobes.

References

External links
line drawing at Missouri Botanical Garden, iconospecimen of Sagittaria engelmanniana
Go Botany, New England Wildflower Society Sagittaria engelmanniana
Connecticut Botanical Society, Engelmann's Arrowhead (Acid-water Arrowhead), Sagittaria engelmanniana
Vijverplanten online, Sagittaria engelmanniana

engelmanniana
Flora of the Eastern United States
Plants described in 1894
Freshwater plants
Edible plants